The Forge is a fictional black operations organization from the Big Finish Productions audio plays based on the long-running British science fiction television series Doctor Who.

The Forge, also known as Department C4, was founded at the turn of the 20th century to study and experiment with extraterrestrial material and technology and apply it to the security interests of the United Kingdom. It first appeared in Project: Twilight, written by Cavan Scott and Mark Wright. Its agents can sometimes be identified with the use of the code phrase or motto, "For King and Country."

It is similar to the Torchwood Institute in the television series, though the Forge's introduction in the audio plays predates it.

History

In the Sixth Doctor audio play Cryptobiosis, taking place in 1901, the Chief Mate of the cargo ship Lankester was transporting a captured mermaid to an unknown buyer. However, his use of the "King and Country" code phrase during a radio communication implies that the Forge was involved.

The Forge's first known operations were during World War I. Project: Twilight involved the infection of human subjects with the so-called Twilight Virus, which incorporated DNA from vampires to create human-vampire hybrids as super-soldiers. However, the test subjects escaped into the community in October 1915 and slaughtered the base personnel. The Forge's chief scientist, Dr William Abberton, was mortally wounded and injected himself with the virus to survive. He then assumed the code name of Nimrod and dedicated himself to tracking down the escaped vampires. The Seventh Doctor, Ace and Hex Schofield encounter the Forge several times.  In 1917, they find The Forge running a secret project at Charnage Hospital to brainwash British soldiers into becoming more aggressive, with a possible side effect of making several subjects time-sensitive (No Man's Land).  Then in 1945 they find The Forge in Postwar London, trying to recapture alien technology which was stolen after the van carrying it crashed in transit (Forty Five: Casualties of War).

Project: Dionysus was the next known operation, which took place during the early 1950s, when Dr Stone attempted to create a rift in spacetime, which was almost used by a race known as the Divergence to break through into our reality (Zagreus). Although there was no explicit mention of the Forge in Zagreus, it was heavily implied that Stone was working for them, as she also uses the "King and Country" code phrase.

In the latter half of the twentieth century, the Forge secretly operated on behalf of British interests, while the international UNIT (which the Forge viewed with contempt) dealt with more public alien threats.

In Project: Twilight, it is 1999, and Nimrod has tracked down the Twilight vampire ringleaders, Reggie Mead and Amelia Dooney, to the South-East London casino Dusk, established to hide their activities.  The Sixth Doctor and Evelyn Smythe befriend casino worker Cassie Schofield and with her help, they learn what they can about Dusk.  This is also the point in the Doctor's life when he first learns about the Forge, as well as meeting Nimrod for the first time.  Eventually, the vampires infect Cassie with a new and stronger form of the Twilight virus.  The Forge's mission ended with the destruction of the casino and the deaths of most of the Twilight vampires.  The Doctor offers to take Cassie with him while he tries to create a cure for her infection, but she chooses to stay on Earth.  He drops her off in Norway and promises to return.

Following the conclusion of Project: Twilight, Nimrod captured Cassie and returned her to the Forge. Over a period of time, she was heavily brainwashed, trained to become a field agent and groomed into becoming Nimrod's replacement as primary northern-European field agent, code-named Artemis. Nimrod was put in charge of a new operation, Project: Valhalla, to scavenge alien technology from a crashed alien spaceship in Lapland. The mission turned into a disaster and the area had to be sterilised when the ship turned out to be a prison for a world-killing Lovecraftian monster known as Nyathoggoth.

After this operation, Nimrod replaced former UNIT-head Colonel Crichton as Deputy Director of the Forge and began Project: Lazarus.  The Sixth Doctor creates a cure for the Twilight Virus, so he and Evelyn track down Cassie in 2004.  Nimrod captures the Doctor and takes DNA samples from him.  Evelyn manages to free Cassie from her brainwashing, mostly by reminding her of her child, Tommy, who she hasn't in years.  The Doctor and Evelyn race to take Cassie back to the TARDIS to be cured, but Nimrod murders her with his crossbow.  After the TARDIS escapes, Project: Lazarus commences.  Using DNA gathered from the Doctor, they attempted to clone him in order to discover the secret of regeneration.  They manage to create dozens of clones, physically identical to the Sixth Doctor, but unable to regenerate, no matter how they're killed.  Also, the clones don't live for very long.  Nimrod dresses the clones like the Doctor and employees them, one at a time, convincing them that they are the real Doctor, reluctantly working with the Forge to stave off an alien invasion.

It was around this time that Nimrod himself recovered the fabled Spear of Destiny from a private collection in Edinburgh as part of Project: Longinus. At present there is no information of what became of the artifact. Artemis and Nimrod were also responsible for locating and abducting the last member of "the Gryphus clan", with Artemis using honeypot methods to accomplish this.

In 2015, The Forge acquired the leader of a Ukrainian cult who had been possessed by an ancient alien who causes jealousy and obsession in others.  The Forge hoped to clone him to use as a distraction in war zones.  However, while the train was transporting him, the Seventh Doctor arrived and trapped the creature's consciousness. (Project Nirvana)

Meanwhile, the Seventh Doctor and Ace start traveling with Hex, a young nurse from 2021.  While searching through his records, the Doctor realizes that Hex is actually Thomas Hector Schofield, Cassie's son, now a grown man.  The Hospital he worked at, St Gart's, had direct connections to the Forge, particularly department C4, researching Cyber technology (The Harvest).  Their advanced computer network, called System, was obtained in Australia, in 2006, from future Cyber tech (The Gathering).

Long after Ace and Hex stop traveling with him, the Seventh Doctor arrives at the Forge in 2007, during the provocation of an alien invasion.  And assisting them is what looks like the Sixth Doctor.  When the real Doctor shows his clone the truth about his origins, he turns on Nimrod, engaging the Hades Protocol, destroying the entire facility, including employees, clones and other living experiments.  However, Nimrod and some of the staff survived and moved to a secondary facility with a new version of their supercomputer, Oracle, adapted from System.  Although the clone actually destroyed the Forge, Nimrod and the other survivors believed it was the real Doctor's doing.

By 2026, the Forge had rebuilt and re-branded itself as the official public face of alien encounters, held accountable by the government.  Even Nimrod had become a public figure.  Once again going by his name William Abberton, he had even been knighted.  But a careless mistake by a someone at the Forge released a deadly mutagen, forcing most of London to be evacuated.  A younger Seventh Doctor (still traveling with Ace and Hex and unaware of his future self's connection to the destruction of the Forge decades in the past), arrived in the middle of this emergency.  From Nimrod's perspective, this is the fourth meeting with the Doctor (but only the Doctor's third meeting with Nimrod). Nimrod knows who Hex is and tells him about the secrets the Doctor has been keeping.  But what Nimrod really wants is the Doctor's Twilight Virus, which he re-engineers to kill all the mutants in London.  The Forge's second in command, Captain Aristedes, is soon convinced that her employers are evil.  She overthrows Nimrod and engages Project: Destiny, the final destruction of the Forge.  Nimrod himself is killed by a sort of zombie version of Cassie.

In A Death in the Family, the Doctor and UNIT pick over the remains of the Forge, looking for dangerous technology.  And the Doctor in particular searches for a Time Lord casket that he had been told was somewhere in their archives.  Inside it, he finds an older version of himself, not dead, but in a sort of trance.  His future self was engaged in a complicated battle with a Word Lord named Nobody No-One, when the Forge obtained the casket.  No-One meanwhile was hiding at the Forge for decades, disguising his wordship as their catch-phrase "For King and Country".

Years later, The Forge rose again, using the profits from their technology to break away from the government and build a new headquarters.  Their new skyscraper was the most scientifically advanced building in the world.  Once again, Oracle controlled the building, but now it was hardwired to the remains of Nimrod, kept in a sealed vault deep below the property.  The Short Trips: Defining Patterns book contains the short story Twilight's End, in which Nimrod subconsciously summons the Seventh Doctor.  Oracle refuses him entry, recalling the destruction of their first two facilities.  Nimrod overrides the decision, reuniting with the Doctor for the final time (but not the final time from the Doctor's perspective).  The Doctor leaves a syringe containing the Twilight Cure, giving Nimrod the choice to use it.

Gods and Monsters implied that the true origins of The Forge were far older than anyone had imagined.  An ancient Elder God, Weyland the Smith claimed he had forged The Forge.  And he had manipulated its most notable personnel, and the Seventh Doctor and several of his companions, all as part of an eternal game against another Elder God, Fenric.

Personnel
Forge personnel have included:

 Dr William Abberton (codename: Nimrod) — The Forge's main field agent and eventually Director. He worked at the Forge for over a century.
 The Director — The shadowy head of the Forge. At the time of Project: Twilight the Director is a man but by Project: Lazarus a woman has been promoted to the position.
 Deputy-Director Crichton — The former head of the British contingent of UNIT somehow became the deputy director of the Forge around the time of Twilight and Valhalla. He was replaced by Nimrod at the end of Project: Valhalla, and found himself under a death warrant.
 Sergeant Frith — The Forge's Security Chief.
 Doctor Edith Crumpton — The Forge's Chief Science Officer.
 Captain Lysandra Aristedes (codename: Perseus) — Sergeant Frith's right-hand woman and eventual head of security.  After destroying The Forge, she became the Doctor's companion.
 Sixth Doctor clones (codename: Lazarus) — Briefly the Forge's scientific advisor. The Doctor himself was also designated Lazarus.
 Cassie Schofield (codename: Artemis) — Nimrod's intended replacement as main Forge field agent.  She is also the mother of the Doctor's companion, Hex Schofield.
 Sergeant French – A soldier who is seconded to I.C.I.S. in UNIT: The Coup.
 Lieutenant-Colonel Brook – An agent during World War One, heading the experiments at Charnage.
 James Clarke – An agent working in Australia in 2006, investigating the possible use of cyber-technology.
 Iris Wildthyme (codename: Jezebel) - she and her traveling companion Panda encountered the Forge between the events of Lazarus and Destiny.

External links
Cavan Scott's website
Project: Twilight at Big Finish Productions
Project: Lazarus at Big Finish Productions
Project: Destiny at Big Finish Productions
A Death in the Family at Big Finish Productions
Project: Valhalla at Big Finish Productions
Project: Twilight Reference Guide
Project: Lazarus Reference Guide
Project: Destiny Reference Guide
A Death in the Family Reference Guide
Project: Valhalla Reference Guide

Doctor Who organisations
Forge